Class 6 may refer to:
 BR Standard Class 6, British 4-6-2 steam locomotive
 Speed Class Rating, the official unit of speed measurement for SD Cards
 NSB Class 6, a standard-gauge steam locomotive of Norway
 NSB Class VI, a narrow-gauge steam locomotive of Norway
 Class VI (U.S. Army), personal demand items (nonmilitary sales items) 
 Class Six Stores sell alcohol, and related items, such as mixers, soda, cigarettes, and drinking cups. Similar items are found at the POST or Base Exchange, but the primary function of Class Six Stores on military installations is alcohol sales.
 NSB El 6, an electric locomotive of Norway
 NSB Di 6, a diesel locomotive of Norway
 SCORE Class 6, off-road racing vehicles
 TS Class 6, a tram of Trondheim, Norway
 Class 6 truck, a US truck class for medium trucks, up to 26,000 pounds weight limit

See also
 Class 06 (disambiguation)